Samir Aït Saïd (born 1 November 1989) is a French male artistic gymnast and a member of the national team. He has won a total of three medals, in each color, in the rings apparatus at the European Championships (2013 to 2015), and was also selected to compete for the French men's artistic gymnastics squad at the 2016 Summer Olympics in Rio de Janeiro. He was a French flag bearer in the opening ceremonies of the 2020 Olympics in Tokyo, and performed a backflip while he was there.

In the qualification phase of the men's artistic gymnastics, Aït Saïd suffered a double compound fracture in his left leg while landing badly on the vault exercise, forcing him to be pulled out of the competition.

He has qualified to represent France at the 2020 Summer Olympics.

References

External links
 

1989 births
Living people
French male artistic gymnasts
French sportspeople of Algerian descent
People from Champigny-sur-Marne
Gymnasts at the 2016 Summer Olympics
Olympic gymnasts of France
European champions in gymnastics
Sportspeople from Val-de-Marne
European Games competitors for France
Gymnasts at the 2019 European Games
Medalists at the World Artistic Gymnastics Championships
Gymnasts at the 2020 Summer Olympics
21st-century French people